Wukang may refer to:

Places
 Wukang County, former county in Zhejiang that has been merged into Deqing County
 Wukang Road, a historic road in Shanghai, named after Wukang County
 Wukang Mansion, a historic apartment building on Wukang Road

People
 Xiong Wukang (Chinese: 熊毋康), ruler of the state of Chu during the early Zhou Dynasty (1046–256 BC) of ancient China
 Fu Wukang

See also
Wugang (disambiguation), romanized as Wukang in Wade–Giles